Matthew Kia Yen-wen (17 January 1925 – 22 August 2017) was a bishop of Hualien and Chiayi, an archbishop of Taipei, and the Archbishop Emeritus of Taipei until his death in 2017.

Kia was ordained priest on 15 July 1951 in Tainan, Taiwan. He was appointed the first Bishop of Chiayi on 21 May 1970 and installed on 16 July 1970. He was appointed Bishop of Hualien on 14 December 1974. He became the Archbishop of Taipei on 18 November 1978. He resigned on 11 February 1989.

References

1925 births
2017 deaths
Taiwanese Jesuits
20th-century Roman Catholic archbishops in Taiwan
People from Shijiazhuang
Taiwanese people from Hebei
Jesuit archbishops